St. Joseph's Academy, Dehradun (SJA) is a co-educational Indian Certificate of Secondary Education school in Dehradun, the capital of the state of Uttarakhand in India. Founded in 1934, the school is governed by the Society of the Brothers of St. Patrick (Ireland). It is located in the heart of the city of Dehradun on the main thoroughfare Rajpur Road.

St. Joseph's Academy, Dehradun celebrated the bicentenary of the Patrician Society and the school's 75th anniversary in 2009.

History
St. Joseph's Academy was formally opened and blessed on 2 March 1934 by Rev. Fr. Antanasius. Rev. Bro. A.M. Keogh was the first principal of SJA. When it opened, the roll-call was 21; in 1959, over a thousand students were attending the school. At present, the school has a student strength of 3400 and 120 teachers.

St. Joseph's Academy has an auditorium, built in 1984 and inaugurated by Mother Teresa. The auditorium has a seating capacity of nearly 1300 people.

In 2004 St. Joseph's completed 70 years, to commemorate the occasion, the play ‘Peter Pan’ was staged. The musical 'Joseph and the Amazing Technicolor Dreamcoat' was staged in 2006 and on the 80th anniversary the musical 'Anandsagar' was staged.

Motto
The school motto (Latin) is "Laborare Est Orare", which means "Work is Worship".

Academics
The school is affiliated to the Council for the Indian School Certificate Examinations. The school conducts the standard 10th ICSE and the standard 12th ISC examinations.

SJA offers education from Kindergarten to Class 12th, with five to six sections in each class. Students have a choice to study Science or Commerce after Class 10th.

House system
The student body is divided into four houses. This is done to cultivate in the students a sense of competitiveness, dedication and teamwork. Events such as Cultural Week (Confluence), the Sports-Day and the House Cup are held each year.

The four houses, named after the former Principals of the school, are:
 Bergin (Blue)
 Donovan (Yellow)
 Dooley (Green)
 Duffy (Red)

Cultural week
Cultural Week was at first a non-competitive show wherein students performed in music, dramatics, dance, and G.K. Quizzes. It was changed to a 3–4 days, Inter-House competitive event in 1996. Discontinued for a few years, a Cultural Week was organized on the 75th anniversary of the school, in 2009.

Sports
It has teams for cricket, football, basketball, hockey, lawn tennis, table tennis, badminton, volleyball and chess. Students compete in inter-house events as well as inter-school events.

Sports Day
The Annual Athletics Meet events are short races (100m, 200m, 400m), long races (800m, 1500m), javelin, short-put, long-jump, high jump and relay races. Students participate in the categories of Sub-juniors, Juniors, and Seniors. The final event of the day is the cycle race. The school awards trophies for individual performance followed by the inter-house shield; awarded to the house with maximum points on the day.

Student Council
The Student Council comprises 38 members. Council members are chosen by the faculty and Principal. Members lead their houses in inter-house and inter-school events throughout the year. The breakdown is as follows:
  2 House Captains (1 male, 1 female). Appointed in class 12, on basis of academic achievements.
  2 Sports Captains (1 male, 1 female). Appointed in class 12, on basis of athletic performance in the Sports Day, or any other sports-related achievements such as being a national- or international-level player.
  1 Cultural prefect (Male or Female). Appointed in class 12, on basis of cultural contributions to the house, such as representing the school in inter-school events, or the Cultural Week
  2 Vice prefects (1 male, 1 female). Appointed in class 11, if he has shown to have potential to be a prefect or head boy/girl in the future. Usually on basis of academic achievement.
  2 Special Prefects (Both Males or Females or 1 male and 1 female)

In addition to these, there is a Head Boy and Head Girl.

Notable alumni
The school has an official alumni association that has its own website.

 Abhimanyu Easwaran - first class cricketer
 Anirudh Thapa - Indian professional footballer
 Arvind Krishna - CEO of IBM
 Jubin Nautiyal - Indian playback singer
 Kaydor Aukatsang - Tibetan politician
 Navtej Sarna - author-columnist (former Ambassador to United States, High Commissioner to UK and Ambassador to Israel)
 Nitin Sahrawat - actor, environmentalist
 Prahlad Kakkar - founder and key director for Genesis Film Productions, an Indian production house
 Pranati Rai Prakash - winner of India's next top model
 Prem Rawat - author and Global Peace Ambassador
 Rrahul Sudhir - actor
 Rohit Manucha - CHRO, Visiting Faculty, Executive Coach, Global HR Thought Leader 
 Vijai Singh Shekhawat - Chief of Naval Staff of the Indian Navy

References

External links
 School website
 Alumni website

Patrician Brothers schools
Catholic schools in India
Boarding schools in Uttarakhand
Christian schools in Uttarakhand
Schools in Dehradun
Educational institutions established in 1934
1934 establishments in India